Siberian Scientific Research Institute of Metrology is a scientific organization in Zheleznodorozhny District of Novosibirsk, Russia. It was created in 1944.

History
The institute was created in 1944 on the basis of evacuated laboratories of the Kharkov, Leningrad and Moscow institutes of metrology. The organization was called the Novosibirsk State Institute of Measures and Measuring Instruments.

In 1955, a metrological base was created at the institute, which became the second metrological base of the USSR.

In 1968, Novosibirsk State Institute of Measures and Measuring Instruments was renamed Siberian Scientific Research Institute of Metrology.

In 1988, a 12-story laboratory building of doubles of state standards was built.

In 1993, the institute received the status of the State Scientific Metrological Center.

In 2008, SNIIM creates the State primary standard for the unit of surface density of heat flux (GET 172-2008).

In 2013, the Institute develops the State primary standard for the unit of angle of phase shift between two electrical signals in the frequency range from 0.1 MHz to 65 GHz (GET 207-2013).

Activities
The institute creates, investigates and improves state primary standards, explores new physical effects.

SNIIM improves measuring methods, sets the values of fundamental physical constants, it is engaged in determining the parameters of the Earth's rotation etc.

Products 
SNIIM produces various measuring instruments: UKDP-1 (installation for measuring the complex dielectric constant), SIM-4 analyzer (device for measuring the mass fraction of water as a percentage in oil products), IMV (device for measuring the magnetic susceptibility of dia-, para-, and weakly magnetic substances and materials in solid, liquid, and powder states) etc.

Standards

Primary standards
 State primary standard of unit of electric capacity (ГЭТ 107-77)
 State primary standard for the unit of surface density of heat flux (ГЭТ 172-2008)
 State primary standard of units of relatives of dielectric and magnetic permeabilities in the frequency range from 1 MHz to 18 GHz (ГЭТ 174-2009)
 State primary standard of a unit of wave resistance in coaxial waveguides (ГЭТ 75-2011)
 State primary standard of the electric Q factor (ГЭТ 139-2013)
 State primary standard for the unit of angle of phase shift between two electrical signals in the frequency range from 0.1 MHz to 65 GHz (ГЭТ 207-2013)

Secondary standards 
State secondary standard of the unit of time and frequency (ВЭТ 1-19), state secondary standard of the unit of dielectric permittivity (ВЭТ 129-2-91), state secondary standard of the unit of magnetic permeability of ferromagnets (ВЭТ 122-1-93) etc.

Awards
In 1984, the institute was awarded the Order of the Red Banner of Labour.

Bibliography

External links
 70th anniversary of the Siberian State Research Institute of Metrology (Novosibirsk, 1944). Library of Siberian Local History. 70 лет Сибирскому государственному научно-исследовательскому институту метрологии (Новосибирск, 1944). Библиотека сибирского краеведения.
 Official website.

1944 establishments in the Soviet Union
Research institutes in Novosibirsk
Research institutes in the Soviet Union
Research institutes established in 1944
Standards organizations in Russia
Zheleznodorozhny City District, Novosibirsk
Metrology organizations